The Event (stylized as THE EVƎNT) is an American television series containing elements of science fiction, action/adventure and political allegory. It was created by Nick Wauters and aired on NBC from September 20, 2010 to May 23, 2011. The plot centers on a group of extraterrestrials, some of whom have been detained by the United States government for sixty-six years since their ship crashed in Alaska, while others have secretly assimilated among the general populace. The series was picked up for a full first season of 22 episodes on October 18, 2010. On May 13, 2011, NBC canceled the series after one season.

Synopsis

Overview 
Near the end of World War II, a craft of undetermined origin crashed in the Brooks Range of northern Alaska. It carried passengers who appeared outwardly human, but were eventually determined to be of extraterrestrial origin. Their DNA is slightly less than one percent different from humans, and they age at a much slower rate. Since ninety-seven captured survivors refused to disclose information to the US, they were held in a nearby government facility, located on fictional Mount Inostranka. The remaining survivors, also known as the Sleepers, were able to escape the crash scene, as they, unlike those who were captured, sustained only minor injuries. Those who escaped ended up hiding among the regular populace.

In the present day, U.S. President Martinez learns of the facility's existence shortly after his inauguration and decides, after meeting the leader of the detainees, to release them and disclose their existence to the world, despite the objections of the intelligence agencies. His plans are put on hold when an assassination attempt on him is foiled by means beyond human technology. The CIA realizes there are other extraterrestrials and secretly plans to find and detain them. Unknown to the agency, the agent chosen to head the effort is himself one of those extraterrestrials. The escaped extraterrestrials, upon learning of the CIA's plans, have mixed reactions: some want to try to salvage attempts to peacefully assimilate, while others want to fight against the populace.

Caught in the middle of these events is Sean Walker, whose plans to propose to his girlfriend Leila on a Caribbean cruise are cut short when she mysteriously disappears from the ship. His investigation eventually leads him to uncover the assassination plot.

Narrative technique 
The show's pilot episode is told almost entirely in retroversions to three different time frames. According to Nick Wauters, the show's creator, later episodes would use flashbacks more to develop the characters. "There will be big reveals and big clues in each episode," he said, promising that viewers would not have to wait too long for answers to questions raised. After the pilot aired, he and executive producer Steve Stark answered some viewer questions on their Twitter feeds, one being the fate of the plane used in the assassination attempt, which ended up disappearing through a portal before it could crash. The characters also have Twitter feeds, and one had a blog, truthseeker5314.com, which would reveal additional information. The last two episodes before and all episodes following the show's hiatus no longer featured flashbacks. Cast member Blair Underwood said regarding the removal of the flashbacks, "We had been jumping around a lot and doing flashbacks and that was confusing to people," and "So when we come back, that device is done with! We are now telling the story straight through so people can track it and follow it easier."

Cast

Main cast 
 Jason Ritter as Sean Walker – a software engineer who becomes involved in a government conspiracy when his would-be fiancée, Leila, mysteriously disappears during their Caribbean cruise. Sean later finds Leila and the two begin to uncover the conspiracy.
 Sarah Roemer as Leila Buchanan – Sean's girlfriend, who is kidnapped. After being rescued, she tries to find her younger sister who has also been kidnapped. It is revealed that she and her little sister are half non-terrestrial as their father, Michael Buchanan, was one of the survivors of the 1944 crash.
 Laura Innes as Sophia Maguire – the leader of a mysterious extraterrestrial group of detainees being held at the top-secret facility. She becomes a critical liaison to the President of the United States amidst the cover-up.
 Blair Underwood as Elias Martinez – the recently elected President of the United States, who is stunned to learn that his own government is keeping secrets from him. As he tries to do right by the public, he soon finds himself in the midst of the cover-up, and the target of an assassination attempt.
 Ian Anthony Dale as Simon Lee – a CIA operative and an extraterrestrial who was stationed at Mount Inostranka.
 Scott Patterson as Michael Buchanan – Leila's father, who is thrown into the conspiracy and must go through great lengths to protect his family. He is later revealed to be one of the non-terrestrials that survived the 1944 crash. He is shot and killed by a number of Sophia's people while trying to help Leila and Simon escape.
 Lisa Vidal as Christina Martinez – the First Lady of the United States. In the final episode, it is revealed that the First Lady is one of the "Sleepers" as she calls the planet entering Earth's orbit "Home".
 Bill Smitrovich as Raymond Jarvis – the opposition party Vice President of the United States who is revealed to be involved in the conspiracy. He was later named acting president while Martinez was incapacitated in hospital.
 Clifton Collins, Jr. as Thomas – a member of the non-terrestrials who escaped capture, but now is in contact with the other "Sleepers" who are not imprisoned. He is Sophia's son, and is much more militant than she. He is killed by a Hellfire missile launched from an Apache helicopter in a strike ordered by President Martinez.
 Željko Ivanek as Blake Sterling – the Director of National Intelligence, who has long kept secrets from the President. He was fired by Jarvis when he questioned Jarvis's involvement in Martinez's  poisoning, but later reinstated after Martinez recovered.
 Taylor Cole as Vicky Roberts – a woman who Sean and Leila meet while on a cruise. She is later revealed to be an assassin who formerly worked for the CIA. Vicky kidnaps Leila in an attempt to draw Sean out. She fosters a child she orphaned after participating in a mission where she assassinated the child's family.

Recurring cast 
 Heather McComb as Agent Angela Collier  – an FBI agent that was involved in the arrest of Sean Walker. Initially, Walker's claims of the series of events that lead to Leila's disappearance seem delusional to Collier, but after witnessing her coworkers and friends get killed by the people who are after Sean, she becomes entangled with Walker as the truth unravels.
 D. B. Sweeney as Carter – an assassin who worked alongside Vicky to hold Leila.
 Hal Holbrook as James Dempsey – an elderly and powerful businessman who is the head of the vast conspiracy to cover up the existence of the aliens. He gives orders to Vicky and Carter and has a private army of innumerable assassins to carry out his orders. He is revealed to have the ability to shift to a younger version of himself. He is a part of an ancient sub-human race that has been fighting the aliens for three millennia. To motivate Sean to take on Sophia, he kills himself.
 Scott Michael Campbell as Justin Murphy – an agent working for the Office of Director of National Intelligence who is set up by undercover agents to appear as the traitor in the government who helped Sophia escape.
 Necar Zadegan as Isabel – an alien who is in a relationship with Thomas and supports his own agenda against Sophia. She is killed along with Thomas when Martinez fires a missile on the bus she and Thomas were on.
 Clea DuVall as Maya – an extraterrestrial who killed her boyfriend William for telling Sterling secrets about the detainees. She was later shot and killed by Thomas while trying to protect Sterling.
 Roger Bart as Richard Peel – the White House Chief of Staff.

Development and production 
Producer Steve Stark brought the original script to NBC in 2009, after hearing that the network was looking for "event-type" series to add to its television lineup. The script was written by Nick Wauters in 2006. The show appeared on NBC's development slate in early January 2010, when the network announced at the Television Critics Association presentation that it had green-lit production of a pilot episode.

Casting announcements began in early February, with Jason Ritter landing the lead role of Sean Walker. In late February, Željko Ivanek was cast as Blake Sterling, and Ian Anthony Dale signed on as Simon Lee. This was followed a few days later by the addition of Scott Patterson and Sarah Roemer to the cast. Roemer was cast as Sean's girlfriend, Leila Buchanan, with Patterson portraying her father, Michael. In late February, Laura Innes was cast as Sophia Maguire, a role which was originally envisioned as male. Blair Underwood came on board in early March in the role of President Eli Martinez, a role which was originally planned for a Hispanic actor. Finally, the addition of Taylor Cole completed the main cast.

Jeffrey Reiner signed on to direct, after having agreed to a deal with Universal Media Studios to work on new projects. He also served as an executive producer. After having read the pilot script, he called it a "page turner." Lisa Zwerling, who also signed a deal with UMS, served as a consulting producer.

On May 7, 2010, NBC announced that it had given a thirteen episode order for The Event, followed by the announcement that Evan Katz had signed as showrunner and executive producer. A week later, the network announced that the series would appear on the Fall 2010 television schedule, airing on Mondays at 9 pm. On October 18, 2010, NBC announced it ordered nine more episodes, giving the show a twenty-two episode season.

In mid-July 2010 Clifton Collins, Jr. was cast as Thomas, a character described as "a key player in the show's secret conspiracy".

The series is a thriller, love story, and mystery with an element of science fiction. Unlike other well known series of the same genre, producers had promised timely answers to mysteries, with some answers provided as early as the upcoming episode. Executive producer Evan Katz stated that "everything is designed to answer questions so you're not frustrated or feeling like we're making it up as we go along" and the writers intended to keep the viewers guessing in a "fair way."

Episodes

Reception

Reviews 

The Event was one of four new series screened at San Diego Comic-Con in July 2010, with The Hollywood Reporter saying the crowd response suggested "NBC's fall drama The Event came up a big winner."

Reviews of the pilot episode were generally favorable, scoring 67 out of 100 on Metacritic, and invoking many comparisons to 24 (Evan Katz‘s other produced show) and Lost (another science fiction show), each of which had ended its run the preceding spring of 2010. Mary McNamara of the Los Angeles Times called it "as big, brash and promising as Heroes was a few years back". Variety'''s Brian Lowry called it "an enticing start". Linda Stasi of the New York Post stated that "if 24, Lost, and The 4400 had a baby, it would be The Event".

Some more cautious commentators said the show had promise but could not go on tantalizing the audience with a proliferation of mysteries. "The effort required to follow the story", said Barry Garron of The Hollywood Reporter, "goes well beyond what most viewers might be willing to give." Ken Tucker of Entertainment Weekly called the pilot "an irritating tease" and hoped the second episode would answer some of the questions the pilot asked.

 Ratings 
The pilot episode received 10.88 million viewers and a 3.6/9 adults 18–49 rating/share, placing third in its timeslot at 9:00 pm ET.  After averaging 9.1 million viewers for the first four episodes, NBC picked up the series for a full season.

However, by the final episode of 2010 on November 29, the series had cut its audience by 46% and its demo rating by 48%, to 5.83 million and a 1.9/5 respectively, although both of these were up noticeably from the previous week.  On November 15, NBC announced that The Event would be going into hiatus after the November 29 episode, and would return on February 28, 2011 (later pushed back to March 7).  Upon its return, the series received 5.23 million viewers and a then-series-low 1.4/4 18–49 rating/share; the latter of these figures represented a 26% plunge from the fall finale. The series had since gone as low as 3.85 million viewers and a 1.1/3 rating/share in 18–49, first on April 18 and again on May 9.

Awards 

Home media
The complete series was released on DVD in region 1 on August 23, 2011, in region 2 on October 17, 2011 and in region 4 on August 24, 2011. Special features on the DVD include seven behind-the-scenes featurettes, six audio commentaries with cast and crew, deleted scenes, episode recaps, a photo gallery, and a never-before-seen look at Dempsey's back story.

 Broadcast The Event'' has been syndicated for broadcast in several countries worldwide, including Canada where it aired simultaneously with the U.S., United Kingdom, Ireland, and New Zealand.

Possible series continuation
After the series' cancellation, the Syfy channel had been rumored to be in talks to continue the series as a miniseries; this was later denied by Syfy's Craig Engler. At the 2011 Television Critics Association Tour, NBC chairman Robert Greenblatt revealed the possibility of a TV movie. He said, "It's been discussed with Syfy and a few weeks ago it seemed more possible than it does today, but I honestly don't know." If it were to happen, it would air on Syfy, and not NBC.

References

External links 

 

2010s American drama television series
2010 American television series debuts
2011 American television series endings
American action television series
American adventure television series
2010s American political television series
2010s American science fiction television series
English-language television shows
NBC original programming
Nonlinear narrative television series
Serial drama television series
Television series by Universal Television
Television shows set in Los Angeles
Television shows set in Washington, D.C.
American political drama television series
Television series set in 2005